A vesiculobullous disease is a type of mucocutaneous disease characterized by vesicles and bullae (i.e. blisters). Both vesicles and bullae are fluid-filled lesions, and they are distinguished by size (vesicles being less than 5–10 mm and bulla being larger than 5–10 mm, depending upon which definition is used). In the case of vesiculobullous diseases which are also immune disorders, the term immunobullous is sometimes used. Examples of vesiculobullous diseases include:

 Infectious: (viral)
 Herpes simplex
 Varicella-Zoster infection
 Hand, foot and mouth disease
 Herpangina
 Measles (Rubeola)
 Immunobullous:
 Pemphigus vulgaris
 Pemphigoid
 Dermatitis herpetiformis
 Linear immunoglobulin-A disease (linear IgA disease)
 Genetic:
 Epidermolysis bullosa

Some features are as follows:

References

External links 

Genodermatoses
Oral mucosal pathology